A separation oracle (also called a cutting-plane oracle) is a concept in the mathematical theory of convex optimization. It is a method to describe a convex set that is given as an input to an optimization algorithm. Separation oracles are used as input to ellipsoid methods.

Definition 
Let K be a convex and compact set in Rn. A strong separation oracle for K is an oracle (black box) that, given a vector y in Rn, returns one of the following:

Assert that y is in K.
 Find a hyperplane that separates y from K: a vector a in Rn, such that  for all x in K.

A strong separation oracle is completely accurate, and thus may be hard to construct. For practical reasons, a weaker version is considered, which allows for small errors in the boundary of K and the inequalities. Given a small error tolerance d>0, we say that:

 A vector y is  d-near K  if its Euclidean distance from K is at most d;
 A vector y is  d-deep in K  if it is in K, and its Euclidean distance from any point in outside K is at least d.

The weak version also considers rational numbers, which have a representation of finite length, rather than arbitrary real numbers. A weak separation oracle for K is an oracle that, given a vector y in Qn and a rational number d>0, returns one of the following::

Assert that y is d-near K;
 Find a vector a in Qn, normalized such that its maximum element is 1, such that  for all x that are d-deep in K.

Implementation 
A special case of a convex set is a set represented by linear inequalities: . Such a set is called a convex polytope. A strong separation oracle for a convex polytope can be implemented, but its run-time depends on the input format.

Representation by inequalities 
If the matrix A and the vector b are given as input, so that , then a strong separation oracle can be implemented as follows. Given a point y, compute :

 If the outcome is at most , then y is in K by definition;

This oracle runs in polynomial time as long as the number of constraints is polynomial.

Representation by vertices 
Suppose the set of vertices of K is given as an input, so that  the convex hull of its vertices. Then, deciding whether y is in K requires to check whether y is a convex combination of the input vectors, that is, whether there exist coefficients z1,...,zk  such that:  

 ;
    for all  i in 1,...,k.

This is a linear program with k variables and n equality constraints (one for each element of y). If y is not in K, then the above program has no solution, and the separation oracle needs to find a vector c such that

  for all  i in 1,...,k.
Note that the two above representations can be very different in size: it is possible that a polytope can be represented by a small number of inequalities, but has exponentially many vertices (for example, an n-dimensional cube). Conversely, it is possible that a polytope has a small number of vertices, but requires exponentially many inequalities (for example, the convex hull of the 2n vectors of the form (0,...,±1,...,0).

Problem-specific representation 
In some linear optimization problems, even though the number of constraints is exponential, one can still write a custom separation oracle that works in polynomial time. Some examples are:

 The minimum-cost arborescence problem: given a weighted directed graph and a vertex r in it, find a subgraph of minimum cost that contains a directed path from r to any other vertex. The problem can be presented as an LP with a constraint for each subset of vertices, which is an exponential number of constraints. However, a separation oracle can be implemented using n-1 applications of the minimum cut procedure.
 The maximum independent set problem. It can be approximated by an LP with a constraint for every odd-length cycle. While there are exponentially-many such cycles, a separation oracle that works in polynomial time can be implemented by just finding an odd cycle of minimum length, which can be done in polynomial time.
The dual of the configuration linear program for the bin packing problem. It can be approximated by an LP with a constraint for each feasible configuration. While there are exponentially-many such cycles, a separation oracle that works in pseudopolynomial time can be implemented by solving a knapsack problem. This is used by the Karmarkar-Karp bin packing algorithms.

Non-linear sets 
Let f be a convex function on Rn. The set    is a convex set in Rn+1. Given an evaluation oracle for f (a black box that returns the value of f for every given point), one can easily check whether a vector (y, t) is in K. In order to get a separation oracle, we need also an oracle to evaluate the subgradient of f. Suppose some vector (y, s) is not in K, so f(y) > s. Let g be the subgradient of f at y (g is a vector in Rn). Denote .Then, and for all (x, t) in K: . By definition of a subgradient:  for all x in Rn. Therefore, so  , and c represents a separating hyperplane.

Usage 
A strong separation oracle can be given as an input to the ellipsoid method for solving a linear program. Consider the linear program .  The ellipsoid method maintains an ellipsoid that initially contains the entire feasible domain . At each iteration t, it takes the center  of the current ellipsoid, and sends it to the separation oracle:

These points are definitely not optimal.
Since  for all feasible x,  this implies that   for all feasible x. These points are definitely not feasible. 

After making a cut, we construct a new, smaller ellipsoid, that contains the remaining region. It can be shown that this process converges to an approximate solution, in time polynomial in the required accuracy.

Converting a weak oracle to a strong oracle 
Given a weak separation oracle for a polyhedron, it is possible to construct a strong separation oracle by a careful method of rounding, or by diophantine approximations.

Relation to other oracles

Membership oracle 
A membership oracle is a weaker variant of the separation oracle, which does not require the separating hyperplane. 

Formally, a strong membership oracle for K is an oracle that, given a vector y in Rn, returns one of the following:

Assert that y is in K.
 Assert that y is in not in K.

Obviously, a strong separation oracle implies a strong membership oracle.

A weak membership oracle for K is an oracle that, given a vector y in Qn and a rational number d>0, returns one of the following:

Assert that y is d-near K;
 Assert that y is not d-deep in K.

Using a weak separation oracle (WSO), one can construct a weak membership oracle as follows.

 Run WSO(K,y,d). If it returns "yes", then return "yes".
 Otherwise, run WSO(K,y,d/3). If it returns "yes", then return "yes".
 Otherwise, return "no"; see  for proof of correctness.

Optimization oracle 
An optimization oracle is an oracle which finds an optimal point in a given convex set.

Formally, a strong optimization oracle for K is an oracle that, given a vector c in Rn, returns one of the following:

 Assert that K is empty.
 Find a vector y in K that maximizes   (that is, . for all x in K).

A weak optimization oracle for K is an oracle that, given a vector c in Qn and a rational number d>0, returns one of the following:

 Assert that no point is d-deep in K;
 Find a vector y that is d-near K, such that  for all x that are d-deep in K.

Violation oracle 
A strong violation oracle for K is an oracle that, given a vector c in Rn and a real number r, returns one of the following:
 Assert that  for all x in K;
A weak violation oracle for K is an oracle that, given a vector c in Qn, a rational number r, and a rational number d>0, returns one of the following:
 Assert that   for all x that are d-deep in K;
Find a vector y that is d-near K, such that .
A major result in convex optimization is that, for any "well-described" polyhedron, the strong-separation problem, the strong-optimization problem and the strong-violation problem are equivalent

A major result in convex optimization is that, for any "well-described" polyhedron, the strong-separation problem, the strong-optimization problem and the strong-violation problem are polynomial-time-equivalent. That is, given an oracle for any one of these three problems, the other two problems can be solved in polynomial time. A polyhedron is called "well-described" if the input contains n (the number of dimensions of the space it lies in), and contains a number p such K can be defined by linear inequalities with encoding-length at most p. The result is proved using the ellipsoid method.

References

Computation oracles
 
Mathematical optimization